Liarbird (released 30 September 2011 in Oslo, Norway by label Bolage – BLGCD 018) is a Jazz album by the Norwegian jazz violinist Ola Kvernberg. After the premiere at Trondheim Jazz Festival and concerts at Moldejazz feat. Joshua Redman and Oslo Jazz Festival, Kvernberg's commissioned work Liarbird is highly acclaimed.

Reception 
Liarbird was awarded Spellemannprisen 2011 for best Jazz album of the year, and the review by Norwegian newspaper Dagbladet awarded the album dice 6. The review by AllMusic awarded the album 4.5 stars.

Track listing

Musicians 
Ola Kvernberg - guitar, mandolin, bass, piano and percussion, in addition to their various fiddles
Mathias Eick - trumpet
Håkon Kornstad - saxophone
Eirik Hegdal - saxophone
Bergmund Waal Skaslien - viola
Ingebrigt Håker Flaten - double bass, bass guitar and electronics
Ole Morten Vågan - double bass, bass guitar and electronics
Erik Nylander - drums and percussion
Torstein Lofthus - drums

References

External links 
Ola Kvernberg Official Website
Liarbird at Kolben Consert Hall September 17, 2011, Rikskonsertene on YouTube

Jazz albums by Norwegian artists
Spellemannprisen winners
2011 albums